Tuttosport is an Italian sport newspaper published in Turin, Italy.

History and profile
Tuttosport was first published on 30 July 1945. Renato Casalbore (who later died in the 1949 Superga air disaster alongside the Il Grande Torino football squad) founded the newspaper as a bi-weekly. In 1946, it moved to three editions a week, and since 12 March 1951 it has been published daily. The paper has its headquarters in Turin. It is published in broadsheet format. Typical issues have 28 or 32 pages and are produced in four editions, targeted respectively at Turin, Rome, Milan, and Genoa.

The newspaper is edited by Xavier Jacobelli; his predecessors have included Vittorio Oreggia, Paolo De Paola, Giancarlo Padovan, Antonio Ghirelli, and Gianpaolo Ormezzano.

Circulation
Tuttosport had a circulation of 123,921 copies in 2004. The circulation of the paper was 115,533 copies in 2008. In 2012 the paper sold 64,355,791 copies.

Golden Boy Award
The Golden Boy award is given out to the top under-21-year-old football player active in Europe.

Golden Player Man Award

The Golden Player Award is given out to the top over 21 year old football player active in Europe.

Golden Player Woman Award

Golden Player Girl Award

References

This article was originally based on the corresponding article from the Italian Wikipedia, as retrieved on 15:14, 3 December 2006 (UTC).

External links 
 online version

1945 establishments in Italy
Newspapers established in 1945
Newspapers published in Turin
Italian-language newspapers
Sports newspapers
Sports mass media in Italy
Sport in Turin
Daily newspapers published in Italy